Felimare muniainae is a species of colourful sea slug or dorid nudibranch, a marine gastropod mollusc in the family Chromodorididae.

Distribution 
This species was described from Santo Antonio, Isla de Príncipe, Gulf of Guinea in the Atlantic Ocean.

References

Chromodorididae
Gastropods described in 1996